Golden Balls is a British daytime game show.

Golden Balls may also refer to:

 Golden Balls (film), a 1993 Spanish film
 Golden Balls (video game), a 2008 video game developed by Mindscape
 David Beckham (born 1975), English footballer
 The traditional symbol for a pawnbroker, derived from the coat of arms of the Medici family

See also

 Golden Ball (disambiguation)